Hanafy Ali El-Gebali is an Egyptian politician. He is a member of the Egyptian parliament of the House of Representatives since October 2020. He was elected as Speaker of the House of Representatives on 12 January 2021.

El-Gebali previously served as chief justice of the Supreme Constitutional Court.

Early life 
He was born 14 July 1949 in Cairo, Egypt,

He graduated from Cairo University in 1975 and got a post diploma from Ain Shams University in 1977 in criminal law. He earned a PhD in Constitutional law.

Career 
He started working in the judicial department and rose to become deputy Attorney General in 1978. He was moved down to Constitutional Court at State Council in 2001 as member and became deputy judge in 2005. He served as a secretary-general of the Union of Arab Constitutional Courts from 2011– 2018. He retired from the judicial board in 2019 and joined the Parliament after serving as the chief of Supreme Constitutional Court in 2019.

When serving as the head of SCC, he issued many rulings in cases up to 227.

He published books that have been translated into different languages.

Votes 
He polled 508 votes out of 576 votes of the parliament and the majority of the votes came from the National List for Egypt party. He has been elected into parliament since 2019.

Tiran and Sanafir island controversy 
As a judge he approved the maritime border agreement between Egypt and Saudi Arabia. Cairo had agreed to cede the island of Tiran and Sanafir to Saudi Arabia in 2016. Later President Sisi signed the agreement. This caused great irritation to many opposition politicians. When Tiran and Sanafir were transferred, many citizens protested and objections were made against the decision. Gebali claimed that it was the government's decision.

References 

1949 births
Living people
Politicians from Cairo
Academic staff of Ain Shams University
Members of the House of Representatives (Egypt)
Scholars of constitutional law
Judges from Cairo
Speakers of the Parliament of Egypt
Cairo University alumni
Ain Shams University alumni